This is a list of the National Register of Historic Places listings in Northwest Arctic Borough, Alaska.

This is intended to be a complete list of the properties and districts on the National Register of Historic Places in Northwest Arctic Borough, Alaska, United States.  The locations of National Register properties and districts for which the latitude and longitude coordinates are included below, may be seen in a Google map.

There are 3 properties and districts listed on the National Register in the borough, both National Historic Landmarks.

Current listings

|}

See also 

 List of National Historic Landmarks in Alaska
 National Register of Historic Places listings in Alaska

References 

 
Northwest